Jean Jones may refer to:

Jean Jones (Colorado) in Colorado Women's Hall of Fame
Jean Jones  (lawn bowler), international lawn bowler from Jersey
Jean Jones (artist), English painter

See also

Gene Jones (disambiguation)